Karlstadt is a town in the Main-Spessart in the Regierungsbezirk of Lower Franconia (Unterfranken) in Bavaria, Germany. It is the administrative centre of Main-Spessart (Kreisstadt), and has a population of around 15,000.

Geography

Karlstadt lies on the River Main in the district (Landkreis) of Main-Spessart, roughly 25 km north of the city of Würzburg. It belongs to the Main-Franconian wine-growing region. The town itself is located on the right bank of the river, but the municipal territory extends to the left bank.

Since the amalgamations in 1978, Karlstadt's Stadtteile have been Gambach, Heßlar, Karlburg, Klein Laudenbach, Laudenbach, Mühlbach, Rohrbach, Stadelhofen, Stetten, and Wiesenfeld.

History
From the late 6th to the mid-13th century, the settlement of Karlburg with its monastery and harbor was located on the west bank of the Main. It grew up around the Karlsburg, a castle perched high over the community, that was destroyed in the German Peasants' War in 1525.

In 1202, Karlstadt itself was founded by Konrad von Querfurt, Bishop of Würzburg. The town was methodically laid out with a nearly rectangular plan to defend Würzburg territory against the Counts of Rieneck. The plan is still well preserved today. The streets in the old town are laid out much like a chessboard, but for military reasons they are not quite straight.

In 1225, Karlstadt had its first documentary mention. In 1236, the castle and the village of Karlburg were destroyed in the Rieneck Feud. In 1244, winegrowing in Karlstadt was mentioned for the first time. From 1277 comes the earliest evidence of the town seal. In 1304, the town fortifications were finished. The parish of Karlstadt was first named in 1339. In 1369 a hospital was founded. Between 1370 and 1515, remodelling work was being done on the first, Romanesque parish church to turn it into a Gothic hall church. About 1400, Karlstadt became for a short time the seat of an episcopal mint. The former Oberamt of the Princely Electorate (Hochstift) of Würzburg was, after Secularization, in Bavaria's favour, passed in 1805 to Grand Duke Ferdinando III of Tuscany to form the Grand Duchy of Würzburg, and passed with this to the Kingdom of Bavaria.

The Jewish residents of the town had a synagogue as early as the Middle Ages. The town's synagogue was destroyed on Kristallnacht (the Night of Broken Glass, 9 November 1938) by Nazi SA men, SS, and Hitler Youth, as well as other local residents.  Its destruction is recalled by a plaque at the synagogue's former site. The homes of Jewish residents were attacked as well, the possessions therein were looted or brought to the square in front of the town hall where they were burned, and the Jews living in the town were beaten.

Governance

The mayor of Karlstadt is Michael Hombach (CSU), elected in 2020.

The council is made up of 24 council members, excluding the mayor.

(as of 2 March 2008)

The town's coat of arms might be described thus: Quarterly, first and fourth azure, second and third argent a fleur-de-lis gules. The town's earliest seal, from 1277, showed an effigy of Charlemagne, who is said to have founded and named the town (Charlemagne is called Karl der Große in German). The next seal after this one also bore Charlemagne's likeness, and this appeared on town seals until the 18th century. However, in 1544 the town began using a quartered shield as its arms. This is thought to have come from the banner of state borne by the Prince-Bishopric (Hochstift) of Würzburg, to which the town once belonged. The fleurs-de-lis were added in the early 19th century, and they refer to Charlemagne.

Transport
 Karlstadt lies at the junction of two Bundesstraßen, the B 26 and the B 27. On two road bridges, the Old Main Bridge (Alte Mainbrücke) built in 1953 and the more northerly New Main Bridge (Neue Mainbrücke) built in 2005, the river Main can be crossed.
 Through the municipal area runs the Hanover-Würzburg high-speed rail line, north-south. Within the municipal territory lie a section of the Mühlberg Tunnel and part of the Nantenbach Curve.
 Karlstadt has a small airfield east of the town.

Economy

Local industry includes Düker Ironworks, the Schwenk Cement Works, and the Kohl Wood Veneer Factory. Besides these three large industrial plants, many handicraft businesses have also set up shop in Karlstadt. Another big employer is the Main-Spessart Landratsamt (district administration). Many inhabitants commute to Würzburg, 25 km away, or Lohr am Main, 18 km away.

Winegrowing has only a small economic importance nowadays, but still has great cultural significance. Vineyards in Karlstadt are the Roßtal and Im Stein. There are also others in centres, especially in Stetten (Stettener Stein) and on the way from the main town out to Gambach.

Education
In 1999 the following institutions existed in Karlstadt:

 Kindergartens: 549 places with 548 children
 Primary schools: 5 with 63 teachers and 1,147 pupils
 Gymnasium: 1 with 60 teachers and 923 students
 Realschule with just under 600 students (in 2004)
 “Piranha” youth cultural centre: 1,000 visitors each year

Notable people

 Johannes Schöner (b. 1477, d. 1547 in Nuremberg), mathematician, geographer, cartographer, astronomer, and astrologist
 Andreas Bodenstein (b. about 1482, d. 1541 in Basel), Protestant Reformer
  (b. about 1494, d. 1566 in Wittenberg), theologian, humanistic philosopher, and reformer
  (b. 1522, d. 1587 in Strasbourg), historian, poet, jurist, and official
 Johann Rudolph Glauber (b. 1604 in Karlstadt; d. 1670 in Amsterdam), apothecary and chemist
 Franz Sperr (b. 1878, d. 23 January 1945 executed in Plötzensee Prison), member of the Widerstand resistance to the Third Reich
  (b. 1887, d. 1915 near Soldau), painter
  (b. 1894 in Wiesenfeld-Erlenbach, d. 1971), writer, poet
 Ruth Westheimer (b. Karola Ruth Siegel and known as "Dr. Ruth," 4 June 1928 in Wiesenfeld), sex therapist, talk show host, author, professor, Holocaust survivor, and former Haganah sniper; later, U.S. citizen.
  (b. 1948 in Aschaffenburg, d. 2007 in Karlstadt), carnevalist
 Roland Büchner (b. 1954), choirmaster of the Regensburger Domspatzen

Gallery

References

External links

 Town’s official webpage 
 

Main-Spessart
Würzburg
Lower Franconia
Populated places on the Main basin
Populated riverside places in Germany